Vanadium(IV) fluoride (VF4) is an inorganic compound of vanadium and fluorine. It is paramagnetic yellow-brown solid that is very hygroscopic. Unlike the corresponding vanadium tetrachloride, the tetrafluoride is not volatile because it adopts a polymeric structure. It decomposes before melting.

Preparation and reactions
VF4 can be prepared by treating VCl4 with HF:
VCl4 + 4 HF → VF4 + 4 HCl

It was first prepared in this way.

It decomposes at 325 °C, undergoing disproportionation to the tri- and pentafluorides:
2 VF4 → VF3 + VF5

Structure
 The structure of VF4 is related to that of SnF4. Each vanadium centre is octahedral, surrounded by six fluoride ligands. Four of the fluoride centers bridge to adjacent vanadium centres.

References

WebElements

Vanadium(IV) compounds
Fluorides
Metal halides